The Yellow River is the second longest river in China.

Yellow River may also refer to:
Xar Moron, a river in northeastern China
Yellow River (County Leitrim), Ireland
Yellow River (County Offaly), Ireland
Yellow River (Papua New Guinea)
The Yellow River languages of Papua New Guinea
Hwang River, South Korea

In the United States
Yellow River (Florida)
Yellow River (Georgia)
Yellow River (Indiana)
Yellow River (Iowa)
four streams named Yellow River in Wisconsin:
Yellow River (Chippewa River)
Yellow River (Red Cedar River)
Yellow River (St. Croix River)
Yellow River (Wisconsin River)
a former name for the Missouri River in Kansas
Yellow River, a former name for a tributary of the Kuskokwim River in Aniak, Alaska, USA, and namesake of the Yellow River Stampede, a gold rush in 1900-1901

Music
"Yellow River" (song), a 1970 song by Christie
Yellow River Piano Concerto

See also

Yellow Creek (disambiguation)